Andrei Vladimirovich Morozov (born 3 April 1968) is a former Russian professional footballer.

Club career
He made his professional debut in the Soviet Second League B in 1991 for FC Uralets Nizhny Tagil. He played 3 games in the UEFA Intertoto Cup 1996 for FC Uralmash Yekaterinburg.

References

1968 births
Living people
Soviet footballers
Russian footballers
Association football midfielders
Association football defenders
Russian Premier League players
FC Ural Yekaterinburg players
FC Uralets Nizhny Tagil players